In early 1961, a series of bushfires burned in the south-west region of Western Australia. The devastating fires burned large areas of forest in and around Dwellingup from 20 to 24 January, at Pemberton and in the Shannon River region between 11 and 15 February, and in the Augusta-Margaret River area in early March.  There were also major fires which burned in the Darling Scarp around Kalamunda.  The towns of Dwellingup and Karridale were largely destroyed by the fires, as were a number of smaller railway and mill settlements. There was no loss of human life.

Whilst the 1960 rainy season over the affected region had not been excessively dry, rainfall had been below average over the region affected by the fires ever since August of that year - thus the forests were perhaps even drier than they would normally be by January. However, the underlying cause of the Dwellingup fires lay far to the north in the Pilbara, where a tropical cyclone had formed on 15 January northeast of Darwin had followed a trajectory along the north west Western Australian coast and intensified north east of Onslow and then moved steadily southwards, hitting that town on 24–25 January while having a central pressure of 920 hPa. Hurricane-force winds demolished several buildings and storm surge inundated the town with 1.8 metres water. With a strong high pressure system to the east of the cyclone remaining almost stationary for some days, hot north-easterly winds developed and became so intense that by the 20th maximum temperatures throughout the south west were uniformly above  and remained at that level for the following five days. During this period,  as the cyclone moved slowly along the coast it drenched Onslow and the neighbouring district, but only dry thunderstorms occurred in the south-west, which started fires that spread extremely rapidly in the hot, windy conditions.

Although as the cyclone tracked down the west coast some rain came around 25 January to ease the fires, not all were fully extinguished.

The fire from Dwellingup consequently moved downslope toward the major town of Pinjarra where it burned a significant portion of the town's buildings—500 people were left homeless.  As the forests surrounding began re-igniting, the entire population of a number of other mill towns was relocated to Dwellingup in the following days. The fires continued to burn owing to the strong winds, and many tiny timber towns were completely burnt out - Holyoake, Nanga Brook, Marrinup and Banksiadale; and were never re-built.

The 2 March saw Onslow’s third cyclone in five weeks, which like the second did not produce any rain in the affected areas and led to temperatures reaching in Perth  on the first two days of March for the first time. Fires spread southward to Augusta-Margaret River Shire, though some in that area were thought to have been deliberately lit, and continued to rage within 25 kilometres of Perth city. Although rain was predicted, it did not eventuate. Despite the dryness of the cool change, an easing of the winds allowed fire fighters to finally bring the flames under control.

Following the fires, a Royal Commission was conducted to investigate causes and in following years many recommendations were made to improve controlled burning in the tall eucalypt forests of the south-west.

References

Further reading
 Holland, Jo (1982) The Day the flames came - Dwellingup 1961 Dwellingup, W.A : J. Holland
 (1986) Dwellingup bushfires of 25 years ago remembered Sunday times (Perth, W.A.), 26 Jan. 1986, p. 4
 Richards, Ronald, (1993)  Murray and Mandurah : a sequel history of the Old Murray District of Western Australia. Pinjarra, W.A : Shire of Murray and City of Mandurah.   - fires at pp. 609–628
 Rodger, G.J. (1961) Report of the Royal Commission appointed to enquire into and report upon the bush fires of December, 1960 and January, February and March, 1961 in Western Australia : the measures necessary or desirable to prevent and control such fires and to protect life and property in the future, and the basic requirements for an effective state fire emergency organization / by G. J. Rodger, Royal Commissioner.  (Summary Report covers fires in Chittering, Gidgegannup, Dwellingup, Augusta-Margaret River (Karridale), Pemberton, Denmark, Gleneagle, Kalamunda and Gooseberry Hill, South Coogee, Mandurah, Lesmurdie-Kalamunda-Bickley, and also on the coastal plains north of Perth, and elsewhere such as Balladonia)
 Fahy, Moira (2006) The Day the Flames Came - Dwellingup 1961 - DVD, 30 minutes :  Department of Conservation and Land Management, Fire and Emergency Services Authority of Western Australia, Bushfire CRC

External links
 Cyclone and fire in South West Western Australia
 Fires of 1961 - 41-day inferno
 Tropical Cyclone tracks for 1960-61 season
 Notable cyclones affecting Onslow

Bushfires in Western Australia
1961 fires in Oceania
1961 in Australia
1960s wildfires
Darling Range
1961 natural disasters
1961 Western Australian bushfires
January 1961 events in Australia
February 1961 events in Australia